Amara lacustris also known as Lake-Loving Sun Beetle is a species of seed-eating ground beetle in the family Carabidae. It is found in North America.

References

Further reading

 

lacustris
Articles created by Qbugbot
Beetles described in 1855
Taxa named by John Lawrence LeConte